Toothless may refer to:

 Edentulism, the condition of toothlessness
 Toothless (film), a 1997 made-for-TV fantasy film
 Toothless, fictional dragon character from the How To Train Your Dragon franchise and book series